April Berg (née Nowak, born March 4, 1974) is an American politician of the Democratic Party. In 2020, she was elected to the Washington House of Representatives to represent the 44th legislative district and took office on January 11, 2021.

References

1974 births
Living people
21st-century American politicians
People from Marysville, Washington
Democratic Party members of the Washington House of Representatives